Samuel Adams Ettelson (November 19, 1874 – May 9, 1938) was an American lawyer and politician. He served in the Illinois Senate representing the 3rd District in Chicago from 1906 through 1918. He was a Republican.

Biography
Born in Chicago, Illinois, Ettelson graduated from West Division High School. He attended Harvard College and Lake Forest College. Ettelson graduated from the Chicago College of Law in 1897. He was admitted to the Illinois bar and practiced law in Chicago. Ettelson served as corporation counsel for the city of Chicago. He served in the Illinois Senate from 1907 until 1923 and was a Republican. Ettelson died at Michael Reese Hospital from complications from surgery.

References

1874 births
1938 deaths
Lawyers from Chicago
Politicians from Chicago
Harvard College alumni
Lake Forest College alumni
Chicago-Kent College of Law alumni
Republican Party Illinois state senators